Lee Chan-dong (born 10 January 1993) is a South Korean footballer who plays as midfielder for Jeju United in K League 1.

Career
He was selected by Gwangju FC in the 2014 K League draft.

International
Lee was part of the senior South Korea squad for the 2015 EAFF East Asian Cup.

Club statistics

Honours

International

South Korea
 EAFF East Asian Cup : 2015

References

External links 

1993 births
Living people
Association football midfielders
South Korean footballers
Gwangju FC players
Jeju United FC players
Gimcheon Sangmu FC players
K League 1 players
K League 2 players
Footballers at the 2016 Summer Olympics
Olympic footballers of South Korea
Sportspeople from North Chungcheong Province